The Visitor is the nineteenth studio album by the British hard rock band UFO, which was released on 2 June 2009. Bass parts were recorded by Peter Pichl. Since there are no writing credits on the album booklet, they were posted on UFO's official website (June 2009).

The digipak edition bonus track, "Dancing with St. Peter", had previously been recorded by Phil Mogg with his side project, $ign Of 4, featuring Mogg/Way guitarist Jeff Kollman, one-time Michael Schenker Group drummer Shane Gaalaas, and bassist Jimmy Curtain. The album was originally released in 2002 through Track Records and re-issued in 2008 by Kollman's label Marmaduke Records under the name Mogg & The Sign Of 4.

Track listing

Personnel

Band members
 Phil Mogg – vocals
 Vinnie Moore – lead guitar
 Paul Raymond – keyboards, rhythm guitar, engineer
 Andy Parker – drums

Additional musicians
 Peter Pichl – bass guitar
 Martina Frank – backing vocals on "Living Proof" and "Forsaken"
 Melanie Newton – backing vocals on "On the Waterfront" and "Forsaken"
 Olaf Senkbeil – backing vocals on "Stop Breaking Down", "Saving Me", "Hell Driver" and "On the Waterfront"

Credits
 Tommy Newton – producer, engineer, mixing
 Andy Le Vein – engineer
 Tristan Greatrex – album artwork
 Kai Swillus – photography
 Peter Knorn – management

Charts

References

External links
 The Visitor's feature at UFO's official website
 The Visitor's feature at the UFO fansite
 The Visitor's feature at The Ripple Effect blog
 The Visitor's feature at Heavy Metal Addiction blog
 The Visitor's feature at Nightwatcher's House Of Rock blog

2009 albums
UFO (band) albums
SPV/Steamhammer albums